The Van Wickle House, also known as the Symen Van Wickle House, is a historical house located at 1289 Easton Avenue in the Somerset section of Franklin Township, Somerset County, New Jersey, United States. It was built in 1722 by Symen Van Wickle,  also known as Symen Van Wicklin. The house, historically known as The Meadows, was added to the National Register of Historic Places on December 4, 1973.

Evert Van Wickle
Evert Van Wickle was a carpenter from the Netherlands who emigrated to New Amersfoort, which is now Flatlands, Brooklyn, and married Elizabeth Van Liew. Around 1700, Evert purchased almost  of land on the Raritan River in Somerset. Evert had a son: Symen Van Wickle (c1700-1754) who married Geradina Couwenhoven (1705-?).

Symen Van Wickle
Symen built his home facing the Raritan River in 1722. The location was called the "upper fording place". Behind the house was the link between Middlebush, New Jersey and Raritan Landing, New Jersey called "Old Middlebush Road" (now DeMott Lane in Somerset). Evert and Geradina had the following children: Elsje Van Wickle (c1723-?); Evert Van Wickle (c. 1726-?); Nicholas Van Wickle (c. 1728-?); Mattje Van Wickle (c. 1730-?); Seytje Van Wicklin (1732-?); Anne Van Wickle (c. 1734-?); Dinah Van Wickle (1734-?); and Mary Van Wickle (c.1738-?).

Delaware and Raritan Canal
Around 1835, the Delaware and Raritan Canal was built between the Raritan River and the Van Wickle House.

Preservation
In 1976 the house was put up for sale and was eyed by developers until a grassroots group of concerned citizens organized to protect the historic house.  "The Meadows" was a name long associated with the house so this group took the name Meadows Foundation for the name of their organization.  Through fundraising and a Green Acres grant they were able to acquire and preserve the house.  The Meadows Foundation runs programming at the Van Wickle house such as their Candlelight Concert and Fireside Chats series as well as seasonal celebrations such as Sinterklaas (Dutch Santa) Festival and, in cooperation the Franklin Township Parks and Recreation Department, programs such as the Pumpkin Patch Halloween Celebration and the Bunny Jamboree. Nominal donations accepted at events help with maintenance and restoration costs.

Temporary closure
In late October 2014 the Meadows Foundation closed the Van Wickle House to the public, citing structural damage from flooding that had occurred during Hurricane Irene and Hurricane Sandy. The organization added that it was "working diligently with county, state and federal agencies to save this historic structure with a complete restoration." The grounds surrounding the house remain open to the public.

See also
 List of the oldest buildings in New Jersey

References

Harry Macy, Jr.; The Van Wicklen/Van Wickle Family: Including its Frisian Origin and Connections to Minnerly and Kranchheyt; The New York Genealogical and Biographical Record, Vol. 128, No. 3 (July 1997); p. 184.

External links
Van Wickle House - Meadows Foundation
 

Franklin Township, Somerset County, New Jersey
Houses on the National Register of Historic Places in New Jersey
Houses in Somerset County, New Jersey
Houses completed in 1722
Meadows Foundation (New Jersey)
National Register of Historic Places in Somerset County, New Jersey
New Jersey Register of Historic Places
Historic American Buildings Survey in New Jersey
1722 establishments in the Thirteen Colonies